Fincastle is an unincorporated community in Franklin Township, Putnam County, in the U.S. state of Indiana.

History
Fincastle was laid out in 1838. The community's name may be derived from Fincastle, Virginia. A post office was established at Fincastle in 1847, and remained in operation until it was discontinued in 1905.

Geography

References

Unincorporated communities in Putnam County, Indiana
Unincorporated communities in Indiana